Timon tangitanus, commonly known as the Moroccan eyed lizard, is a species of lizard in the family Lacertidae. The species is endemic to Northwest Africa.

Description
The body is green or brown, with blue ocelli on the back.

Taxonomy
For decades T. tangitanus has been regarded as belonging to the genus Lacerta.

Diet
T. tangitanus mainly feed on invertebrates, but also on fruits.

Distribution
T. tangitanus is found in Northwest Africa (mountains of northwestern Algeria, mediterranean regions of Morocco and Western Sahara).

Habitat
The natural habitats of T. tangitanus are temperate forests, temperate shrubland, and Mediterranean-type shrubby vegetation. It prefers woodland edge, scrub and  rocky areas.

Conservation status
T. tangitanus is threatened by habitat loss.

References

External links
"Timon tangitanus ". The Reptile Database. www.reptile-database.org.
Dragon Farm

Further reading
Boulenger GA (1887). Catalogue of the Lizards in the British Museum (Natural History). Second Edition. Volume III. Lacertidæ ... London: Trustees of the British Museum (Natural History). (Taylor and Francis, printers). xii + 575 pp. + Plates I-XL. (Lacerta ocellata Var. tangitana, new variety, pp. 13-14 + Plate III, figures 1, 1a).

Timon (genus)
Reptiles described in 1887
Taxa named by George Albert Boulenger
Taxonomy articles created by Polbot